William Joseph Wilson was the Dean of Cloyne from 1908 to 1934.

He was educated at Trinity College, Dublin; and ordained in 1878. After curacies in Dungourney and Cork he held incumbencies at Corkbeg and Templebreedy until his appointment as Dean.

References

Alumni of Trinity College Dublin
Irish Anglicans
Deans of Cloyne